Cluff was a BBC TV detective television series set in the fictional town of Gunnershaw in the Yorkshire Dales. Based on the eponymous novels by Gil North, it featured Leslie Sands in the title role as Sergeant Caleb Cluff, and ran for two series between 1964-1965. The series was filmed around Skipton, North's hometown.

The entire first series including the pilot is missing from the BBC archives, but the second series has survived. The script for all episodes of this two-part series were written by North himself.

Cast
 Leslie Sands as Detective Sergeant Caleb Cluff
 John Rolfe as Detective Constable Barker
 John McKelvey as PC Harry Bullock
 Olive Milbourne as Annie Croft
 Eric Barker as Inspector Mole (series one)
 Michael Bates as Inspector Mole (series two)
 Jack Howlett as Doctor Hamm
 Pauline Williams as Mrs Madge Mole
 Maggie Lambert as Mary Croft
 Clive as Cluff's dog

Episodes

Series 1
 6 April 1964: The Drawing Detective (pilot) (missing)
 3 August 1964: The Vagrant (missing)
 10 August 1964: The Amorous Builder (missing)
 17 August 1964: The Screeching Cat (missing)
 24 August 1964: The Widow (missing)
 31 August 1964: The Daughter-In-Law (missing)
 7 September 1964: The Manufacturer's Wife (missing)

Series 2
 15 May 1965: The Chicken
 22 May 1965: The Brothers
 29 May 1965: The Cigarettes
 5 June 1965: The Thief
 12 June 1965: The Professional
 19 June 1965: The Fireraiser
 4 July 1965: The Strangers
 11 July 1965: The Convict
 18 July 1965: The Daughters
 25 July 1965: The Husband
 1 August 1965: The Pensioner
 8 August 1965: The Dictator
 15 August 1965: The Village Constable

References

External links
 
 Cluff at Lost Shows.com
 Cluff at Television Heaven

1964 British television series debuts
1965 British television series endings
1960s British drama television series
BBC television dramas
Lost BBC episodes
Black-and-white British television shows
English-language television shows
Television shows set in Yorkshire